Pantilius tunicatus is a species of bug in Miridae family that could be found in the Baltic states, Faroe Islands, Finland, Italy, United Kingdom, Yugoslavia, the Netherlands, Eastern, Central, and Western Europe (except for Portugal). and across the Palearctic to Siberia and northern China. Also Scandinavia with the exception of the high north and the northern Mediterranean.The species feed on hazel and usually are found on the lowest branches of it. The adults have a brown pronotum and green legs, with the antennae shorter than the body. The species doesn't appear until September.

References

Mirinae
Insects described in 1781
Hemiptera of Europe